William Augustin Martin Jr. (June 1, 1878 – August 5, 1955) was an American college football player and coach. He served as the head football coach at the University of Alabama in 1899, compiling a record of 3–1.

Martin died after a heart attack in 1955. He had resided in Lookout Mountain, Tennessee.

Head coaching record

References

External links
 

1878 births
1955 deaths
19th-century players of American football
American football ends
Alabama Crimson Tide football coaches
Virginia Cavaliers football players
Sportspeople from Chattanooga, Tennessee